The Hendricks County Flyer is a newspaper which began publishing in 1965 and ceased publication in May 2019. It was delivered every Wednesday and Saturday.

About the Flyer
The Hendricks County Flyer focuses on community news with an emphasis on people, schools and local government and serves the towns of Amo, Avon, Brownsburg, Clayton, Coatesville, Danville, Lizton, North Salem, Pittsboro, Plainfield, and Stilesville.

References

External links
www.flyergroup.com
The Flyer on Facebook

Newspapers published in Indiana